The second government of Jaume Matas was formed on 1 July 2003, following the latter's election as President of the Balearic Islands by the Parliament of the Balearic Islands on 26 June after the 2003 regional election.

Investiture

Council of Government
The Government of the Balearic Islands was structured into the offices for the president and 12 ministries from 2003 to 2005 and 13 ministries from 2005 to 2007.

Notes

References

Cabinets established in 2003
Cabinets disestablished in 2007
Cabinets of the Balearic Islands